The Bizarre Country is a 1988 former Yugoslav drama/fantasy film based on the satirical novellas Stradija and Danga, written by Serbian writer Radoje Domanović.

Plot
A man dies in a foreign land. On his deathbed he asks his son to bury his bones in his fatherland, a country of brave and honest people, a country of tragic but heroic past. His son wanders the world unsuccessfully looking for his father's home. He eventually finds the country in which people speak in his father's language, but everything else is absurd and unbelievable and does not fit his father's stories.

Cast
 Lazar Ristovski as The Traveler
 Jasmina Avramović as The Blackhaired Girl
 Dragan Maksimović as The Painter
 Enver Petrovci as The New Chief of Police
 Milija Vuković as The Old Chief of Police
 Milutin Butković as The Higher Clerk of the Ministry 
 Milenko Zablaćanski as The Guitarist
 Branislav Platiša as The Violinist
 Živojin Milenković as The Minister of Agriculture
 Branko Pleša as The Minister of the Foreign Affairs
 Dragoljub Milosavljević as The Minister of Finance
 Spiro Guberina as The Minister of The Inner Affairs
 Gordana Gadžić as The Painter's Sister
 Mihajlo Viktorović as The Minister of Economy
 Karlo Molnar as The Courier of the Ministry

See also 
 Cinema of Yugoslavia
 Cinema of Serbia

External links

1988 films
Serbian fantasy drama films
1980s Serbian-language films
1980s fantasy drama films
Yugoslav fantasy drama films
1988 drama films